The Robert Lee McKenzie House (also known as the Belle Booth House) is a historic house in Panama City, Florida, at 17 East 3rd Court. It was added to the U.S. National Register of Historic Places on August 21, 1986. Robert Lee McKenzie was the first mayor of Panama City and a civic leader for fifty years. The house is a two-story clapboard frame dwelling built in the Dutch Colonial style typical of turn-of-the-20th-century houses in Northern Michigan. It was built in 1909 by Belle Booth who married R. L. McKenzie in 1912; the house was enlarged in 1925.

McKenzie acquired waterfront property and organized the Gulf Coast Development Company with the intent of making Panama City "Atlanta's outlet to the Panama Canal." McKenzie served as mayor of Panama City and two consecutive terms as state representative from Washington County in the Florida Legislature. "Most of the important events of the town's development for a period of over 50 years (1902-1956) are linked with his name and efforts," and the office/library of the McKenzie House was the center of his business activities. In 1964, the park across the street was renamed McKenzie Park in honor of his service to the community.

Gallery

References

External links
 Bay County listings at National Register of Historic Places
 Florida's Office of Cultural and Historical Programs
 Bay County listings
 Bay County markers

Houses on the National Register of Historic Places in Florida
Buildings and structures in Panama City, Florida
Houses in Bay County, Florida
National Register of Historic Places in Bay County, Florida
Vernacular architecture in Florida
Houses completed in 1909